Newtown, New York may refer to:

 Elmhurst, Queens, New York, named Newtown prior 1897
 Elmira, New York, named Newtown prior to 1808
 A community on the Cattaraugus Reservation, Erie County, New York